The summer tanager (Piranga rubra) is a medium-sized American songbird. Formerly placed in the tanager family (Thraupidae), it and other members of its genus are now classified in the cardinal family (Cardinalidae). The species's plumage and vocalizations are similar to other members of the cardinal family.

Taxonomy

The summer tanager was formally described by the Swedish naturalist Carl Linnaeus in 1758 in the tenth edition of his Systema Naturae under the binomial name Fringilla rubra. Linnaeus based his description on the "summer red-bird" described and illustrated by Mark Catesby in his The Natural History of Carolina, Florida and the Bahama Islands which was published in 1729–1732. Catesby gave the location as Carolina, Linnaeus specified America; the type location is now South Carolina. The summer tanager is the type species of the genus Piranga that was introduced by the French ornithologist Louis Jean Pierre Vieillot in 1808. The genus name Piranga is from Tupi Tijepiranga, the name for an unknown small bird; the specific rubra is from Latin ruber meaning "red".

Two subspecies are recognised:
 P. r. cooperi Ridgway, 1869 – breeds in southwest USA and north Mexico, winters in south Mexico
 P. r. rubra (Linnaeus, 1758) – breeds in east USA, winters in north South America

Description
Wingspan ranges from 28 to 30 cm. Adult males are rose red and similar in appearance to the hepatic tanager, although the latter has a dark bill; females are orangish on the underparts and olive on top, with olive-brown wings and tail. As with all other birds, all red and orange colorations are acquired through their diet.

The summer tanager has an American robin-like song, similar enough that novices sometimes mistake this bird for that species. The song consists of melodic units, repeated in a constant stream. The summer tanager's song, however, is much more monotonous than that of T. migratorius, often consisting of as few as three or four distinct units. It is clearer and less nasal than the song of the scarlet tanager. The summer tanager also has a sharp, agitated-sounded call pi-tuk or pik-i-tuk-i-tuk.

Distribution and habitat
Their breeding habitat is open wooded areas, especially with oaks, across the southern United States, extending as far north as Iowa. These birds migrate to Mexico, Central America and northern South America. This tanager is an extremely rare vagrant to western Europe.

Behaviour and ecology
These birds are often out of sight, foraging high in trees, sometimes flying out to catch insects in flight. They mainly eat insects, especially bees and wasps, and berries. Fruit of Cymbopetalum mayanum (Annonaceae) are an especially well-liked food in their winter quarters and birds will forage in human-altered habitat. Consequently, these trees can be planted to entice them to residential areas, and they may well be attracted to bird feeders. Summer tanagers build a cup nest on a horizontal tree branch.

References

External links

 Xeno-canto: audio recordings of the Summer tanager
 Summer tanager bird sound from the Florida Museum of Natural History
 
 
 
 

summer tanager
Native birds of the Southeastern United States
Native birds of the Southwestern United States
Birds of Mexico
summer tanager
summer tanager